The 2018 Tameside Metropolitan Borough Council election took place on 3 May 2018 to elect members of Tameside Metropolitan Borough Council in England. This was on the same day as other local elections.

Ward results 
Asterisk denotes the sitting councillor.

Ashton Hurst ward

Ashton St. Michaels ward

Ashton Waterloo ward

Audenshaw ward

Denton North East ward

Denton South ward

Denton West ward

Droylsden East ward

Droylsden West ward

Dukinfield ward

Dukinfield / Stalybridge ward

Hyde Godley ward

Hyde Newton ward

Hyde Werneth ward

Longdendale ward

Mossley ward

St. Peters ward

Stalybridge North ward

Stalybridge South ward

Changes between 2018 and 2019

Ashton Waterloo by election 2018
Cllr Catherine Piddington, last elected in 2016, died.

References

2018 English local elections
2018
2010s in Greater Manchester